A prison consultant provides newly convicted criminals with advice on how to cope and survive in the unfamiliar surroundings of prison.  Prison consultants may also provide a client's attorney with advice on how to lobby the sentencing judge for a shorter sentence, and how to get a client sentenced to a lower security level prison (the higher a prison's security level, the more violent and dangerous).  They may advise white-collar and celebrity criminals, high-level drug dealers and disgraced politicians to help them navigate the society of prison and make the most of their stay.

Consultants charge anywhere from several hundred to many thousands of dollars, with no promises made. Among their past clients have been Lori Loughlin, Bernard Madoff, Michael Milken, Ivan Boesky, Mike Tyson, Michael Vick, Plaxico Burress, Martha Stewart, and Leona Helmsley.

Practitioners
Becoming a prison consultant requires no formal training or certification, and no agency tracks those in the business. Certifications for prison consultants exist, but none are issued by an accredited entity.  Most people who hold themselves out as prison consultants are ex-convicts who, by the nature of their background, are considered to be disreputable.  Most prison consultants are sole-practitioners, giving cause for further skepticism.

Despite skepticism, the industry is changing; what first was a service accessed only by the rich and famous, services are increasingly being accepted by middle-class convicts.  As the field of practitioners grows, consultants with non-traditional incarceration experience have entered the industry to offer services to those skeptical of solo-practitioners and convicts without verifiable success in custody, including undercover inmates and reality television celebrities from A&E Networks program 60 Days In.

The Federal Bureau of Prisons takes no position on consulting.

Additional advice
In general, consultants will advise prison-bound clients to keep a low profile and avoid offending other inmates.  Offenses can include joining a conversation without an invitation, asking personal questions without a proper cue, and taking liberties with the television (most fights take place in the TV room).

Consultants can help navigate early-release programs and will recommend entry into a drug or alcohol rehab program. Federal prison consultants often educate clients regarding the Residential Drug Abuse Program, a 500 hour program which can reduce a federal sentence up to 12 months.

Consultants may advise about Federal Bureau of Prisons employee personality types; how to defend one's self in a prison fight; and how best to avoid being raped, stabbed or beaten.

Clients are warned to expect strip searches and to accept a complete loss of personal control to the guards.

Commentary on infamous inmates
Much news and discussion of prison consultants has centered on Bernard Madoff. Herbert Hoelter, who advised Madoff, says that Madoff's sentencing to the medium-security Federal Correctional Complex in Butner, North Carolina is appropriate because the facility is next door to a medical center, and if Madoff becomes eligible for transfer to a low-security prison, there is one within the same complex. Hoelter expects that a number of his other clients in Butner will take Madoff under their wing, saying "It's like a buddy system." He thinks Madoff's lengthy term "will give him credibility with other inmates."  His advice to Madoff was "It’s a matter of keeping your space and having respect for other people".

However, Steven Oberfest of The Prison Coach says Madoff enters prison at a disadvantage because the other prisoners know everything about him from the media, but he knows nothing about them.  Oberfest calls Butner "a general, nasty, medium-security-type prison" and says Madoff needs to be careful of other inmates who might be paid by those he defrauded to intimidate or harm him.
Similarly, Larry Levine of Wall Street Prison Consultants expects that someone will make a payment to another inmate's family, a dining-hall distraction will be created, and Madoff will be stabbed.

Hoelter says convicted child molester Jerry Sandusky "is in for a tough, tough ride". Unlike Madoff, who lives among his fellow prisoners, Sandusky will likely have to spend the rest of his life in solitary confinement for his own safety. A similar high-profile child sex offender, John Geoghan, was targeted and murdered by a fellow inmate in 2003. Levine noted the significant dangers in prison for sex offenders.

See also
 Prisoners' rights

References

External links
 You've Got Jail by Jennifer Senior in New York Magazine, July 15, 2002
 Making Crime Pay by Matt Richtel in The New York Times, April 7, 2012

Consulting occupations
Penal imprisonment